The Lucie Arnaz Show is an American sitcom that aired on CBS from April 2 until June 11, 1985. It was based on the British sitcom Agony.

Premise
Dr. Jane Lucas is a psychologist who answers questions from the public on her radio show ("The Jane Lucas Show") and in a magazine. Jim Gordon is her boss.

Cast
Lucie Arnaz as Dr. Jane Lucas
Tony Roberts as Jim Gordon
Karen Jablons-Alexander as Loretta
Lee Bryant as Jill
Todd Waring as Larry Love

Episode list

External links

1980s American sitcoms
1980s American workplace comedy television series
1985 American television series debuts
American television series based on British television series
1985 American television series endings
CBS original programming
Television series about radio
Television shows set in Los Angeles